El Hadji Djibril Fall (born 12 December 1976) is a Senegalese boxer. He competed in the men's light heavyweight event at the 2000 Summer Olympics.

References

External links
 

1976 births
Living people
Senegalese male boxers
Olympic boxers of Senegal
Boxers at the 2000 Summer Olympics
Place of birth missing (living people)
Light-heavyweight boxers